Bassel al-Assad Stadium is a multi-use stadium located in the Baba Amr district in the city of Homs, Syria. It was opened in 2000, and is mostly used for football matches and serves as a second venue for the football clubs of Al-Karamah SC and Al-Wathba SC. Located in the Baba Amr district of the city, the stadium is able to hold up to 25,000 spectators. It was renovated in 2010.

During the Syrian Civil War, Baba Amr was the epicentre of fighting in the 2012 Homs offensive. As a result, the stadium  was heavily damaged and the playing surface was entirely deteriorated. However, the stadium was renovated during 2016 and a new turf was installed.

See also
List of football stadiums in Syria

References

Football venues in Syria
Buildings and structures in Homs
Sports venues completed in 2000
Homs